Rick Porras is an American producer, notably co-producing The Lord of the Rings film trilogy. He grew up in the San Francisco Bay Area and attended Stanford University, graduating in 1988 with a degree in history.

He had a cameo appearance with Peter Jackson and other crew members in the special extended edition of The Return of the King as a Corsair pirate.

Filmography

Producer
 Contact (1997): Associate producer
 The Lord of the Rings: The Fellowship of the Ring (2001): Co-producer
 The Lord of the Rings: The Two Towers (2002): Co-producer
 The Lord of the Rings: The Return of the King (2003): Co-producer
 Cártel, El (2006): Executive producer

Miscellaneous crew
 Death Becomes Her (1992): Production associate
 The Public Eye (1992): assistant to Robert Zemeckis
 Forrest Gump (1994): Archival Research Coordinator
 No Fate But What We Make: 'Terminator 2' and the Rise of Digital Effects (2003): Special thanks
 Big Dreams Little Tokyo (2006): Special thanks

Production manager
 Forrest Gump (1992): Post-production supervisor
 The Frighteners (1996): Post-production supervisor

Second unit director
 The Lord of the Rings: The Fellowship of the Ring (2001): Additional second-unit director
 The Lord of the Rings: The Two Towers (2002)
 The Lord of the Rings: The Return of the King (2003)

Actor
 The Lord of the Rings: The Two Towers (2002) - Gollums Stand-in
 The Lord of the Rings: The Return of the King (2003) - Eldacar (uncredited)
 King Kong (2005) - Gunner #2

External links
 

American film producers
Living people
Year of birth missing (living people)